Carl Johan Frydensberg   (1 December 1835 - 18 March 1904) was a Danish composer.

See also
List of Danish composers

References
This article was initially translated from the Danish Wikipedia.

Danish composers
Male composers
1835 births
1904 deaths
19th-century male musicians